BPU may refer to :

 Branch prediction unit, in computer science,
 Beppu airport, on Kyūshū island, Japan.
 Birmingham Political Union, a political party in Great Britain during the 1830s,
 Biotic Processing Unit, a robotic biology cloud lab capable of carrying out remote-controlled experiments, part of a Stanford University "interactive biotechnology" project
 Bill Producing Unit, a humoristic and sarcastic description in internal slang for the youngest employees in a management consulting firm, which are usually with a customer for most of their work time, which is thus entirely billable to the client,